Daniel Joseph Fitzpatrick (born November 15, 1982) is a former American football punter and placekicker. He was signed by the New York Jets as an undrafted free agent in 2006. He played college football at Notre Dame. Fitzpatrick has also been a member of the Buffalo Bills.

Early years
Fitzpatrick attended Marian High School in Mishawaka, Indiana where he played quarterback, defensive back and kicker. Fitzpatrick was also a captain on the Marian golf team that captured the 2001 Indiana High School Athletic Association.

College career
Fitzpatrick chose to walk-on to the Notre Dame Fighting Irish football team over the South Carolina Gamecocks football team. Prior to his senior season, Fitzpatrick was named a preseason nominee for the Lou Groza Award

Professional career
After going undrafted in the 2006 NFL Draft, Fitzpatrick signed as an undrafted free agent with the New York Jets.
Fitzpatrick was "imported" on October 31, 2008, for one game, by Montreal Alouettes General Manager Jim Popp to replace kicker, Damon Duval. He was released immediately after the game as Duval recovered quickly.

Personal
He received an undergraduate and master's degree in Accounting from the Mendoza School of Business at the University of Notre Dame.
Fitzpatrick is currently a Financial Analyst with Goldman Sachs in their  West Palm Beach, Florida office.

References

External links
Just Sports Stats
Buffalo Bills bio
Notre Dame Fighting Irish bio

1982 births
Living people
American football placekickers
American football punters
Notre Dame Fighting Irish football players
New York Jets players
Berlin Thunder players
Buffalo Bills players
Montreal Alouettes players
People from Granger, Indiana